The 2012 United States Mixed Doubles Curling Championship was held from December 7-11, 2011 at the Broomstones Curling Club in Wayland, Massachusetts. Brady Clark and his wife Cristin Clark won the tournament, earning the right to represent the United States at the 2012 World Mixed Doubles Curling Championship in Erzurum, Turkey.

Teams 
Twenty one teams qualified to compete in the championship.

Round robin

Standings

The 21 teams were split into three pools; each pool played a round robin and at the end the top two teams advanced to the playoffs. The standings at the end of the round robin phase were:

Tiebreakers
Saturday, December 10, 8:00pm ET

Sunday, December 11, 8:00am ET

Playoffs 

The playoffs consisted of a 6-team bracket with the top two teams directly in the semifinals. There was a two-loss provision included, such that a team was not eliminated until they had two losses in the tournament. Because the team of Brady and Cristin Clark entered the playoffs undefeated, they were not eliminated when they lost to Peter and Maureen Stolt in the semifinals and instead got to challenge the winner of the first round of the championship, Alex and Jennifer Leichter, for the title.

Bracket

Quarterfinals 
Sunday, December 11, 11:30am ET

Semifinals 
Sunday, December 11, 3:00pm ET

Final: round 1 
Sunday, December 11, 6:30pm ET

Final: round 2 
Sunday, December 11, 6:30pm ET

References

United States National Curling Championships
Curling in Massachusetts
2012 in curling
December 2011 sports events in the United States
Sports competitions in Massachusetts
2012 in sports in Massachusetts
United States